Ticagrelor, sold under the brand name Brilinta among others, is a medication used for the prevention of stroke, heart attack and other events in people with acute coronary syndrome, meaning problems with blood supply in the coronary arteries. It acts as a platelet aggregation inhibitor by antagonising the P2Y12 receptor. The drug is produced by AstraZeneca.

The most common side effects include dyspnea (difficulty breathing), bleeding and raised uric acid level in the blood.

It was approved for medical use in the European Union in December 2010, and in the United States in July 2011. In 2020, it was the 247th most commonly prescribed medication in the United States, with more than 1million prescriptions.

Medical uses
In the US, ticagrelor is indicated to reduce the risk of stroke in people with acute ischemic stroke or high-risk transient ischemic attack.

In the EU, ticagrelor, co-administered with acetylsalicylic acid (aspirin), is indicated for the prevention of atherothrombotic events in adults with acute coronary syndromes or a history of myocardial infarction and a high risk of developing an atherothrombotic event; and for the prevention of atherothrombotic events in adults with a history of myocardial infarction and a high risk of developing an atherothrombotic event.

Contraindications
Contraindications to ticagrelor are active bleeding, increased risk of bradycardia, concomitant therapy of ticagrelor and strong cytochrome P-450 3A (CYP3A4) inhibitors and moderate or severe hepatic impairment due to the risk of increased exposure to ticagrelor.

Adverse effects
The common adverse effects are increased risk of bleeding (which may be severe) and shortness of breath (dyspnoea). Dyspnoea is usually transient and mild-to-moderate in severity, with a higher risk at < 1 month, 1–6 months and >6 months of follow up compared to clopidogrel. Discontinuation of therapy is rare, although some people do not persist or switch therapies. People who develop tolerable dyspnoea as a side effect of ticagrelor should be reassured to continue therapy, as it does not impact on the drug's cardiovascular benefit and bleeding risk in acute coronary syndrome (ACS). Furthermore, two small subgroup analyses found no associations between ticagrelor and adverse changes in heart and lung function that may induce dyspnoea in stable coronary artery disease (CAD) and people with ACS without heart failure or significant lung disease.

Ventricular pauses ≥3 seconds may occur in people with ACS the first week of treatment, but are likely to be mostly asymptomatic and transient, without causing increased clinical bradycardic adverse events. Caution is recommended when using ticagrelor in people with advanced sinoatrial node disease. Allergic skin reactions such as rash and itching have been observed in less than 1% of people taking ticagrelor.

Interactions 

Inhibitors of the liver enzyme CYP3A4, such as ketoconazole and possibly grapefruit juice, increase blood plasma levels of ticagrelor and consequently can lead to bleeding and other adverse effects. Ticagrelor is a weak CYP3A4 inhibitor and is known to increase the concentrations of CYP3A4 metabolised medications; however, this interaction is unlikely to be clinically significant for atorvastatin and simvastatin at recommended doses. CYP3A4 inducers, for example rifampicin and possibly St. John's wort, can reduce the effectiveness of ticagrelor. There is no evidence for interactions via CYP2C9.

The drug also inhibits P-glycoprotein (P-gp), leading to increased plasma levels of digoxin, ciclosporin and other P-gp substrates. Levels of ticagrelor and AR-C124910XX (the active metabolite of ticagrelor formed by O-deethylation) are not significantly influenced by P-gp inhibitors.

It is recommended to use low-dose aspirin (75–100 mg per day) with ticagrelor as dual antiplatelet therapy (DAPT). The combination of ticagrelor with aspirin doses greater than 100 mg per day may be less effective.

Pharmacology

Mechanism of action 
Like the thienopyridines prasugrel, clopidogrel and ticlopidine, ticagrelor blocks adenosine diphosphate (ADP) receptors of subtype P2Y12. In contrast to the other antiplatelet drugs, ticagrelor has a binding site different from ADP, making it an allosteric antagonist, and the blockage is reversible. Moreover, the drug does not need hepatic activation, which might work better for people with genetic variants regarding the enzyme CYP2C19 (although it is not certain whether clopidogrel is significantly influenced by such variants). Ticagrelor was found to result in a lower risk of stroke at 90 days than clopidogrel, which requires metabolic conversion, among Han Chinese CYP2C19 loss-of-function carriers with minor ischemic stroke or TIA.

Pharmacokinetics
Ticagrelor is absorbed quickly from the gut, the bioavailability being 36%, and reaches its peak concentration after about 1.5 hours. The main metabolite, AR-C124910XX, is formed quickly via CYP3A4 by de-hydroxyethylation at position 5 of the cyclopentane ring.

Plasma concentrations of ticagrelor are slightly increased (12–23%) in elderly people, women, people of Asian ethnicity, and people with mild hepatic impairment. They are decreased in people that self-identified as 'black' and those with severe renal impairment. These differences are not considered clinically relevant. In Japanese people, concentrations are 40% higher than in Caucasians, or 20% after body weight correction. The drug has not been tested in people with severe hepatic impairment.

Consistently with its reversible mode of action, ticagrelor is known to act faster and shorter than clopidogrel. This means it has to be taken twice instead of once a day which is a disadvantage in respect of compliance, but its effects are more quickly reversible which can be useful before surgery or if side effects occur.

Chemistry
Ticagrelor is a nucleoside analogue: the cyclopentane ring is similar to the sugar ribose, and the nitrogen rich aromatic ring system resembles the nucleobase purine, giving the molecule an overall similarity to adenosine. The substance has low solubility and low permeability under the Biopharmaceutics Classification System.

Research

Comparison with related drugs

With clopidogrel 
The PLATO trial concluded superiority of ticagrelor compared to clopidogrel in reducing the rate of death from vascular causes, MI, and stroke in people presenting with acute coronary syndromes. A post-hoc subgroup analysis of the PLATO trial suggested a reduction in total mortality with ticagrelor compared to clopidogrel in people with non-ST elevation acute coronary syndrome. However, this finding should only be considered exploratory as it was not a primary endpoint of the PLATO trial. Subsequent studies have also been underpowered in evaluating total mortality benefits with ticagrelor.

The PLATO trial found that ticagrelor use, in conjunction with low-dose aspirin (where tolerated), had better all-cause mortality rates than the same treatment plan with clopidogrel (4.5% vs. 5.9%, p<0.001) in treating people with acute coronary syndrome. People given ticagrelor were less likely to die from vascular causes, heart attack, or stroke, regardless of whether the treatment plan was invasive. While the patient group on ticagrelor had more instances of fatal bleeding and intracranial bleeding, the difference in cases was not considered significant (p=0.70). Rates of major bleeding were not significantly different between the two groups (7.9% vs. 7.7%, p=0.57). However, dyspnoea was significantly more likely in the ticagrelor group (13.8% vs. 7.8%, p<0.001). Premature discontinuation of the study drug was far more common in the ticagrelor group (23.4% vs. 21.5%, p=0.002), which could be due to adverse events (7.4% vs. 6.0%, p<0.001) or the patient’s unwillingness to continue (10.1% vs. 9.2%, p = 0.04).

The PLATO trial showed a statistically insignificant trend toward worse outcomes with ticagrelor versus clopidogrel among US participants in the study – who comprised 1627 of the total 13,326 participants. The hazard ratio actually reversed for the composite end point cardiovascular (death, MI, or stroke): 11.1% for participants given ticagrelor and 9.1% for participants given clopidogrel (HR = 1.27). It is important to note that even though there was a trend to worse outcomes in the US patient population, this trend was still classed as insignificant, and therefore should not affect patient use in the US population.

There is some conjecture in the safety and efficacy of ticagrelor within the Asian population, despite significant thrombotic benefits. A meta-analysis of observational studies in several Asian countries proposed that ticagrelor did not increase the risk of considerable bleeding events in Asian individuals. It is important to note that despite this being “real world” data, the study did not provide ethnic population demographics, leading to potential generalisation of data for Asian individuals. There is evidence to suggest that East Asian individuals are at a higher risk of bleeding events when using ticagrelor. Several recent meta-analyses of RCTs have been carried out in this population and although underpowered (more research is needed), the Asian Pacific Society of Cardiology Guidelines have taken these trials into account. The guidelines recommend that people of East Asian origin exercise caution and that treatment continuation after six months be based on net-clinical benefit.

With prasugrel 
In 2019, the results of the ISAR-REACT 5 trial was published, comparing ticagrelor and prasugrel in participants with acute coronary syndrome.

An in vitro assay and mouse model study published in 2019, showed antibacterial activity against antibiotic-resistant Gram-positive bacteria including Methicillin Resistant Staphylococcus Aureus (MRSA) and Vancomycin Resistant Enterococcus (VRE). This study used concentrations of ticagrelor for bactericidal activity that far exceeded those achieved by standard post Acute Coronary Syndrome (ACS) doses. A single-center retrospective cohort study demonstrated a significant reduction in gram-positive infection in the first year of ticagrelor compared with clopidogrel post ACS. Treatment with ticagrelor post PCI was also associated with a significantly lower absolute 1-year risk of S. aureus bacteraemia, sepsis, and pneumonia compared to clopidogrel in a nationwide observational study, however no causal inference can be drawn from the observational data.

References

External links 
 

Adenosine diphosphate receptor inhibitors
CYP3A4 inhibitors
Triazolopyrimidines
Fluoroarenes
Alcohols
AstraZeneca brands
Cyclopropanes
Propyl compounds